Vanquis Banking Group, formerly Provident Financial plc, is specialist bank for UK adults who are not served by mainstream lenders. Based in Bradford, England, it specialises in credit cards, online loans and consumer vehicle finance. It is listed on the London Stock Exchange and is a constituent of the FTSE 250 Index.

History
The company was established in Bradford in 1880 by Joshua Kelley Waddilove to provide affordable credit to families in West Yorkshire as the Provident Cloth and Supply Company. The Company was first listed on the London Stock Exchange in 1962.

Provident Financial were one of the first financial institutions to enter into estate agency in the UK, establishing Whitegate Estate Agency in two cities 1978, and by the end of the year was operating in eight Yorkshire towns. The chain grew to 19 branches by the end of 1979, 22 branches by the end of 1980 and 23 branches by the end of 1982. Innovations brought to the market place included seven day opening, computerised mailing lists, a "No Sale - No Fee" guarantee and an all include fixed fee. By late 1985 there were 60 branches of the chain, expanding with a move into the East Midlands in 1986 to 70 branches (the 10 in the East Midlands were acquisitions which had trade during 1986 under their former names. As the chain reached its 10th anniversary towards the end of 1987, the chain totaled 95 branches of which 17 were franchised, rising to 107 branches (27 franchised) by the end of the following year. The chain was sold for £19 million in December 1989 to Legal & General.

In 2002, Provident Financial formed Vanquis Bank, with a full banking licence from the FSA, a consumer credit licence with the Office of Fair Trading and a licence from Visa International to operate and issue credit cards under the Visa brand. Vanquis Bank specialised in the pre-paid credit cards.

In 2005, Provident Financial closed its Yes Car Credit business, which had sold second-hand vehicles to customers with problematic credit histories. The company had been subject to bad publicity, including a TV investigation into its selling practices, pressurisation of staff, unreliable vehicles and debt collection methods. In 2007, it demerged its international business, and a new separate public company was formed called International Personal Finance. This company then held all of Provident Financial's ex-non-UK operations, with the exception of the Republic of Ireland. It also sold the motor insurance business.

In 2011, Vanquis Bank was criticised for offering repayment option plans to their credit card customers, a form of insurance some consumer sites referred to as the 'new payment protection insurance (PPI)'. In 2012, the company was the subject of an episode of the BBC documentary series Panorama, which alleged that the company were breaching Office of Fair Trading guidelines by offering loans to vulnerable people who might not have understood the implications of the contracts they were entering into. The company were criticised by the Citizen's Advice Bureau, whose chief executive told Panorama, "I call into question...the motivation to keep exploiting people who clearly can't be held responsible for their own decisions in that situation."

In 2013, Provident Financial launched its online short-term loan Satsuma Loans.

In 2014, Moneybarn was acquired by Provident Financial plc, joining the home credit and online credit businesses and Vanquis Bank to become the third leg of the group.

The Central Bank of Ireland in late 2014 fined and reprimanded Provident Financial for flagrant breaches of the regulatory requirements aimed at protecting Irish consumers. The five whistleblowers who reported the law breaking were then sacked by Provident, which led to the matter being raised in Dáil Éireann.

On 22 August 2017, Provident Financial lost two-thirds of its stock value in a day, following its second profit warning in two months, the replacement of its chief executive by Manjit Wolstenholme, cancellation of a shareholder dividend and a warning that the full-year dividend might also be cancelled, and the announcement of an investigation by the Financial Conduct Authority. The share price, which had been £32 in April 2017, was £8.50 by the first week of October 2017.

In 2018, Vanquis Bank was fined £2m for failing to properly disclose charges on one of its popular repayment plans. Vanquis was also forced to pay £169m back in compensation to its customers.

In March 2021, Provident Financial announced it intended to introduce a scheme of arrangement, under which £50m would be set aside for compensation payments for unresolved claims made before 17 December 2020.

In December 2021, Provident Financial's doorstep lending business was placed into a managed orderly run-off. The business was closed down on 31 December 2021.

In January 2023, it was announced that the company would be rebranded from "Provident Financial" to "Vanquis Banking Group". It changed its name accordingly on 2 March 2023.

Operations
The main activity is the credit card business, Vanquis Bank, which was set up by Provident Financial in 2002. The customer services department moved to a new call centre in part of what used to be the Naval Dockyards at Chatham in 2008.

In 2009 Vanquis rebranded, launched new credit cards and won the Credit Provider of the Year at the Credit Today Awards. In 2011, a further call centre was opened in Bradford, and a high-yield bond product was authorised by the FSA. Vanquis also received a Passport banking license to operate in Poland in 2012.

Vanquis Bank offer three main credit building cards: Vanquis Card Classic, with an APR of 39.9%, the Vanquis Chrome card which has an APR of 29.5% and also the Vanquis Origin card with an APR of 59.9%. The card offered depends on the credit circumstances of the applicant.

References

External links
 

Companies based in Bradford
Financial services companies established in 1880
Financial services companies of the United Kingdom
1880 establishments in England
Companies listed on the London Stock Exchange
1880 establishments in the United Kingdom
Economy of England